Two museums in France are called Musée Matisse.
Matisse Museum (Le Cateau)
Musée Matisse (Nice)